

Incumbents
President: Luis Guillermo Solís
First Vice President: Helio Fallas Venegas
Second Vice President: Ana Helena Chacón Echeverría

Events
August 5–21 – 11 athletes from Costa Rica competed in the 2016 Summer Olympics in Rio de Janeiro, Brazil

References

 
2010s in Costa Rica
Years of the 21st century in Costa Rica
Costa Rica